Melvin Fitting (born January 24, 1942) is a logician with special interests in philosophical logic and tableau proof systems. He was a professor at City University of New York, Lehman College and the Graduate Center. from 1968 to 2013. At the Graduate Center he was in the departments of Computer Science, Philosophy, and Mathematics, and at Lehman College he was in the department of Mathematics and Computer Science.  He is now Professor emeritus.

Fitting was born in Troy, New York. His undergraduate degree is from Rensselaer Polytechnic Institute, and his doctorate is from Yeshiva University, both in mathematics.  His thesis advisor was Raymond Smullyan.

In June 2012 Melvin Fitting was given the Herbrand Award by CADE, for distinguished contributions to automated deduction.

A loose motivation for much of Melvin Fitting's work can be formulated succinctly as follows.  There are many logics.  Our principles of reasoning vary with context and subject matter.  Multiplicity is one of the glories of modern formal logic.  The common thread tying logics together is a concern for what can be said (syntax), what that means (semantics), and relationships between the two.  A philosophical position that can be embodied in a formal logic has been shown to be coherent, not correct.  Logic is a tool, not a master, but it is an enjoyable tool to use.

Notes

References

External links 
 Melvin Fitting, official homepage 
 The Graduate Center, faculty page at CUNY  
 Mathematical Genealogy Project

1942 births
20th-century American philosophers
21st-century American philosophers
American logicians
City University of New York faculty
Graduate Center, CUNY faculty
Lehman College faculty
Computability theorists
Rensselaer Polytechnic Institute alumni
Living people
People from Troy, New York
Proof theorists
Yeshiva University alumni
Mathematicians from New York (state)